Monochoria vaginalis is a species of flowering plant in the water hyacinth family known by several common names, including heartshape false pickerelweed and oval-leafed pondweed.

It is native to much of Asia and across many of the Pacific Islands, and it is known in other areas as an introduced species.  It is often an invasive noxious weed, and is listed on the United States Federal Noxious Weed List. An aquatic plant, it is invasive in rice paddies and other water bodies. This is an annual or perennial herb growing in water from a small rhizome. It is quite variable in morphology. The shiny green leaves are up to about 12 centimeters long and 10 wide and are borne on rigid, hollow petioles. The inflorescence bears 3 to 25 flowers which open underwater and all around the same time. Each has six purple-blue tepals just over a centimeter long. The fruit is a capsule about a centimeter long which contains many tiny winged seeds.

References

External links

Jepson Manual Treatment
Pacific Island Ecosystems at Risk
Photo gallery

Pontederiaceae
Aquatic plants
Invasive plant species in Sri Lanka
Taxa named by Nicolaas Laurens Burman